"Odour of Chrysanthemums" is a short story by D. H. Lawrence. It was written in the autumn of 1909 and after revision, was published in The English Review in July 1911. Lawrence later included this tale in his collection entitled The Prussian Officer and Other Stories, which Duckworth, his London publisher, bought out on 26 November 1914. An American edition was produced by B W Huebsch in 1916.  Lawrence later adapted the story into the play The Widowing of Mrs. Holroyd.

Plot
Elizabeth Bates is the main character of the story. She has two young children and is pregnant with a third. She is waiting for her husband Walter, a coal miner, to come home. She thinks that he has gone straight to the pub after work, and she feels angry. It turns out to be something completely different.  In the end, she's come to realize that they never did know each other.

Symbolism

Industry
 Locomotive
 Mines
 Machinery: stands for the cruelty and violence, the alienation of life
 Noises: threatening and described in detail

Vegetation
 Vines: the vines remind of vegetation, thus life, but also of the crown worn by Jesus Christ
 Chrysanthemums: flowers offered by the husband on anniversaries, also kind of flowers deposited on graves at funerals
 Yew Tree: name of the pub where Elizabeth doesn't dare to go, tree that typically stands in a cemetery
 Grass: cut by the locomotive that passes by

Biblical names
 Anne: mother of the virgin Mary
 Elizabeth: significance "House of God" or "House of Abundance", is supposed to be sterile but brings life forth
 John: John the Baptist, beheaded and martyred

Life and death
 Children
 Chrysanthemums (see Vegetation)
 Fertility and sterility
 Light versus darkness: colours of the hair, furnace of industry and fire of death, candles, nighttime, fire of warmth and life in the hearth, life versus death

Narration

Film 

In 2002 the story was adapted into a short film by Mark Partridge. The film won first prize at the Milan Film Festival.

Standard edition 

 The Prussian Officer and Other Stories (1914), edited by John Worthen, Cambridge University Press, 1983,

External links 
 Cushman, Keith (2010): Critical materials: 'Odour of Chrysanthemums'., within the portal: "Odour of Chrysanthemums". A text in process. of the University of Nottingham.
 The University of Nottingham (2008): Portal to "Odour of Chrysanthemums". A text in process., writing on the text by scholars of the University of Nottingham.

1911 short stories
Short stories by D. H. Lawrence
Works originally published in The English Review
Short stories adapted into films